Ryan is a village community in the central south part of the Riverina, in the Australian state of New South Wales.  It is situated by road, about 19 kilometres south-west from Henty and 30 kilometres north-east from Walbundrie.

The town was serviced by the Rand branch railway line before the line was closed in 1975.

Notes and references

External links 
 Ryan Railway Siding

Towns in the Riverina
Towns in New South Wales